The 2014 NCAA Men's Gymnastics Championships was a three-day event which determined the 2014 National Champion in Men's Gymnastics. The event took place from April 10 to April 12, 2014, at the Crisler Center in Ann Arbor, Michigan, United States, as it was hosted by the University of Michigan.

National qualifier sessions

Session 1
The first national qualifier session of the 2014 NCAA Men's Gymnastics Championships took place on Thursday April 10 at 1 P.M. The following teams competed in Session 1 of the 2014 NCAA Men's Gymnastics Championships:
No. 1 Oklahoma
No. 4 Stanford
No. 5 Illinois	
No. 8 Iowa
No. 9 California
No. 12 William & Mary
This was the rotation order for session 1 of the 2014 NCAA Men's Gymnastics championships:

Here are the results for session 1 of the 2014 NCAA Men's Gymnastics Championships:

Session 2
The second national qualifier session of the 2014 NCAA Men's Gymnastics Championships took place on Thursday April 10 at 7 P.M. The following teams competed in Session 2 of the 2014 NCAA Men's Gymnastics Championships:
No. 2 Michigan
No. 3 Ohio State
No. 6 Penn State
No. 7 Minnesota
No. 10 Air Force
No. 11 Nebraska
This was the rotation order for Session 2 of the 2014 NCAA Men's Gymnastics championships:

Here are the results for session 1 of the 2014 NCAA Men's Gymnastics Championships:

Team and all-around finals
The team and all-around finals took place on Friday April 11 at 7 P.M. and were televised on BTN. The top three teams from each National Qualifier session on Thursday competed in this event. Additionally, from each session, the top three all-around competitors not on one of the qualifying teams plus the top three individuals on each event not already qualified on a team or as an all-around competitor participated in this event.

Individual event finals
The individual event finals took place on Saturday April 12 at 7 P.M. The top 10 individuals on each apparatus Friday qualified for this event.

References

NCAA Men's Gymnastics championship
NCAA Men's Gymnastics championship
NCAA Men's Gymnastics championship
NCAA Men's Gymnastics championship
NCAA Men's Gymnastics championship